The 1945 Chicago Cubs season was the 74th season of the Chicago Cubs franchise, the 70th in the National League and the 30th at Wrigley Field. The Cubs won the National League pennant with a record of 98–56, 3 games ahead of the second-place St. Louis Cardinals. The team went on to the 1945 World Series, which they lost to the Detroit Tigers in seven games. This was the Cubs last postseason appearance until 1984. It would take 71 years before the Cubs made it to another World Series.

Regular season

Season standings

Record vs. opponents

Roster

Player stats

Batting

Starters by position 
Note: Pos = Position; G = Games played; AB = At bats; H = Hits; Avg. = Batting average; HR = Home runs; RBI = Runs batted in

Other batters 
Note: G = Games played; AB = At bats; H = Hits; Avg. = Batting average; HR = Home runs; RBI = Runs batted in

Pitching

Starting pitchers 
Note: G = Games pitched; IP = Innings pitched; W = Wins; L = Losses; ERA = Earned run average; SO = Strikeouts

Other pitchers 
Note: G = Games pitched; IP = Innings pitched; W = Wins; L = Losses; ERA = Earned run average; SO = Strikeouts

Relief pitchers 
Note: G = Games pitched; W = Wins; L = Losses; SV = Saves; ERA = Earned run average; SO = Strikeouts

1945 World Series

The Curse of Billy "The Goat" Sianis 

The Curse of the Billy Goat was a curse on the Chicago Cubs that was started in 1945 and ended in 2016. As the story goes, Billy Sianis, a Greek immigrant (from Paleopyrgos, Greece), who owned a nearby tavern (the now-famous Billy Goat Tavern), had two $7.20 box seat tickets to Game 4 of the 1945 World Series between the Chicago Cubs and the Detroit Tigers, and decided to bring along his pet goat, Murphy (or Sinovia according to some references), which Sianis had restored to health when the goat had fallen off a truck and subsequently limped into his tavern. The goat wore a blanket with a sign pinned to it which read "We got Detroit's goat". Sianis and the goat were allowed into Wrigley Field and even paraded about on the playing field before the game before ushers intervened and led them off the field.  After a heated argument, both Sianis and the goat were permitted to stay in the stadium occupying the box seat for which he had tickets. At this point, Andy Frain (head of Wrigley Field's hired security company at the time), waved the goat's box-seat ticket in the air and proclaimed, "If he eats the ticket that would solve everything." However, the goat did not. Before the game was over, it started to rain and Sianis and the goat were ejected from the stadium at the command of Cubs owner Philip Knight Wrigley due to the objectionable odor of wet goat. Sianis was outraged at the ejection and allegedly placed a curse upon the Cubs that they would never win another pennant or play in a World Series at Wrigley Field again because the Cubs organization had insulted his goat, and subsequently left the U.S. to vacation in his home in Greece. The Cubs lost Game 4 and eventually the 1945 World Series, prompting Sianis to write to Wrigley from Greece, saying, "Who stinks now?" The Cubs would eventually break the curse and what would turn out to be a 108-year drought by winning the World Series in 2016 over the Cleveland Indians in seven games.

Game 1 
October 3, 1945, at Briggs Stadium in Detroit

Game 2 
October 4, 1945, at Briggs Stadium in Detroit

Game 3 
October 5, 1945, at Briggs Stadium in Detroit

Game 4 
October 6, 1945, at Wrigley Field in Chicago

Game 5 
October 7, 1945, at Wrigley Field in Chicago

Game 6 
October 8, 1945, at Wrigley Field in Chicago

Game 7 
October 10, 1945, at Wrigley Field in Chicago

Farm system

References

External links
1945 Chicago Cubs season at Baseball Reference

Chicago Cubs seasons
Chicago Cubs season
National League champion seasons
Chicago Cubs